Susan M. Fournier is an American marketing professor. She is the Allen Questrom Professor in Management at Boston University and the first female dean of the Questrom School of Business.

Early life and education
Fournier was raised in Woburn, Massachusetts to working-class parents. Her father led a machine shop and her mother waited tables and bartended on weekends. She was the first person in her family to enroll in college when she began majoring in computer science at the University of Massachusetts Amherst. She eventually changed her major to marketing and completed her Master's degree at Pennsylvania State University. Fournier used her master's degree to earn a position as a marketing researcher at Polaroid and Yankelovich Clancy Shulman before returning to school for her PhD at the University of Florida.

Career
Fournier spent over a decade in the marketing industry: twelve years on the Board of Advisors for the Harley Owners Group at Harley-Davidson Motor Company and seven years as a brand advisor to Irving Oil Corporation. On August 27, 2018, Fournier became the first female dean of the Questrom School of Business. During the COVID-19 pandemic, she was recognized among the 11 marketing scholars named Marketing Science Institute Academic Fellows. The following year, she was recognized as a top performer in terms of research impact in a published study conducted by Stanford University. She later became the recipient of the 2021 Distinguished Scientific Contribution Award from the Society of Consumer Psychology.

Selected publications
Building brand community on the Harley-Davidson Posse Ride (2000)
Consumer-brand relationships: theory and practice (2012)
Strong brands strong relationships (2015)

References

External links

Living people
Marketing women
Market researchers
Isenberg School of Management alumni
University of Massachusetts Amherst alumni
Pennsylvania State University alumni
University of Florida alumni
Harvard Business School faculty
Boston University faculty
Year of birth missing (living people)